Sweet Inspiration or variants may refer to:

The Sweet Inspirations, American R&B female vocal group 
The Sweet Inspirations (album), their self-titled debut album 1967  
"Sweet Inspiration", title cut of above and a Top 20 hit in 1968
Sweet Inspiration (Cilla Black album), album by Cilla Black 1970
Sweet Inspiration, album by Delaney Bramlett
Sweet Inspiration, 2021 album by Kate Ceberano
"Sweet Inspiration/ Where You Lead", a 1972 Top 40 hit for Barbra Streisand
"Sweet Inspiration" (Johnny Johnson and the Bandwagon song), 1970. Covered by Cilla Black on album of the same name, 1970
Sweet Inspiration (The Inspirational Choir album), debut album by The Inspirational Choir 1985